"7" is the ninth single by Welsh indie rock band Catfish and the Bottlemen. It is the second single of their second album, The Ride. It was released on 1 April 2016. The single did not contain a B-side.

The song reached number 81 on the UK Singles Chart, and number eight on the US Alternative Songs chart.

7 was written about Alana Haim from the band Haim. If you look closely on the lyric sheet of the song, you will see that the lyric “promise again that I would call her..” the name ‘Alana’ was scratched out and was replaced with the word ‘again’.

Track listing

Charts

Certifications

References

External links
7 - Single at Discogs

2016 singles
2016 songs
Catfish and the Bottlemen songs
Song recordings produced by Dave Sardy